Raymond Lindon (26 December 1901 – 25 January 1992) was a French magistrat, First Advocate General at the Court of Cassation and mayor of the French town of Etretat from May 1929 to March 1959. He was the son of Alfred Lindon and Fernande Citroën.

He was a member of the Legion of Honour.

Lindon, who, under the pen name of Valère Catogan, itself an anagram of avocat général, wrote the short story, Le Secret des rois de France ou la véritable identité d'Arsène Lupin, where it is shown that Maurice Leblanc's creation is the true heir to the French throne. Lindon's book was published in 1955 by les Éditions de Minuit.

Among his other works was the article "Eugène Le Poittevin et ses bains de mer" in La Gazette des Beaux-Arts, December 1967, about the artist whose paintings captured the Parisian social circle that flocked to the beach of Etretat in the 1860s.

One of Raymond Lindon's grandchildren is acclaimed French actor, Vincent Lindon.

References

1901 births
1992 deaths
20th-century French lawyers
Recipients of the Legion of Honour